Bucephala is a genus of diving ducks found in the Northern Hemisphere.

Taxonomy
The genus Bucephala was introduced in 1858 by American naturalist Spencer Baird with the bufflehead as the type species. The genus name is derived from Ancient Greek boukephalos, meaning "bullheaded", from bous "bull", and kephale, "head", a reference to the crest of the bufflehead making its head look large.

The bufflehead was formerly treated as the only member of the genus (sometimes unnecessarily changed to Charitonetta) while the goldeneyes were incorrectly placed in Clangula (as Clangula americana), the genus of the long-tailed duck, which at that time was placed in Harelda. It may yet be correct to recognise two genera, as the bufflehead and the two goldeneyes are well diverged. In this case, Bucephala would be restricted to B. albeola and the name Glaucionetta (Stejneger, 1885) resurrected for the goldeneyes.

Species
The three living species are:

Known fossil taxa are:
 Bucephala cereti (Sajóvölgyi Middle Miocene of Mátraszõlõs, Hungary - Late Pliocene of Chilhac, France)
 Bucephala ossivalis (Late Miocene/Early Pliocene of Bone Valley, United States), which was very similar to the common goldeneye and may even have been a paleosubspecies or direct ancestor
 Bucephala fossilis (Late Pliocene of California, United States)
 Bucephala angustipes (Early Pleistocene of central Europe)
 Bucephala sp. (Early Pleistocene of Dursunlu, Turkey: Louchart et al. 1998)

References

Louchart, Antoine; Mourer-Chauviré, Cécile; Guleç, Erksin; Howell, Francis Clark & White, Tim D. (1998). L'avifaune de Dursunlu, Turquie, Pléistocène inférieur: climat, environnement et biogéographie. C. R. Acad. Sci. Paris IIA 327(5):341-346. [French with English abridged version]  (HTML abstract)

External links
Common Goldeneye at Birdzilla

 
Taxa named by Spencer Fullerton Baird